Peter Kenneth Dews (born 22 April 1952) is a  British philosopher, in the fields of critical theory and continental philosophy. He made his name with the Logics of Disintegration, on the limitations of post-structuralism. He is Professor of Philosophy at the University of Essex.

His first degree was in English, at Queens' College, Cambridge. He has a doctorate in philosophy from the University of Southampton.

Dews is known for his work on the New Left, called 'The New Philosophers and the End of Leftism'.

Work 
 Logics of Disintegration: Post-Structuralist Thought and the Claims of Critical Theory (1987)
 The Limits of Disenchantment: Essays on Contemporary European Philosophy (1995)
 Deconstructive Subjectivities (Ed.) (1994)
 The Idea Of Evil (2008)

References 

1952 births
20th-century British philosophers
21st-century British philosophers
Academics of the University of Essex
Alumni of Queens' College, Cambridge
Alumni of the University of Southampton
Living people